Mulry is a surname. Notable people with this surname include:
Mary Morris (née Mulry, 1921–1997), Irish nurse and war diarist
Joseph A. Mulry (1874–1921), American Jesuit priest, president of Fordham University
Mary Mulry, American statistician
Megan Mulry, novelist, winner of Bisexual Book Awards
Pete Mulry, American baseball player for Tampa Spartans baseball
Ted Mulry (1947–2001), English-born Australian musician
Thomas Maurice Mulry (1855–1916), American businessman and philanthropist
William P. Mulry, acting Commissioner of Public Markets in New York in 1919

See also
Mulry Square in New York City